Honduras is a republic in Central America. It has at times been referred to as Spanish Honduras to differentiate it from British Honduras, which became modern-day Belize. Honduras spans about 112,492 km2 and has a population exceeding 8 million. Its northern portions are part of the Western Caribbean Zone, as reflected in the area's demographics and culture. Honduras is known for its rich natural resources, including minerals, coffee, tropical fruit, and sugar cane, as well as for its growing textiles industry, which serves the international market.

Notable firms 
This list includes notable companies with primary headquarters located in the country. The industry and sector follow the Industry Classification Benchmark taxonomy. Organizations which have ceased operations are included and noted as defunct.

References 

Honduras